Golden Movies Awards is an annual award that celebrates outstanding achievement in African television and film. The inaugural edition was held on 27 June 2015 at the State Banquet Hall, Ghana. In May 2016, Nadia Buari was unveiled as an ambassador for the award. The 2016 edition was hosted by Uti Nwachukwu and Selly Galley on 25 June.

Categories
The following are the categories for the 2019 ceremony:

References

 
2015 establishments in Ghana
Annual events in Ghana
Awards established in 2015
Recurring events established in 2015